McMorrow is an Irish surname, derived from the Gaelic mac Murchada. Notable people with the surname include:

Gerald McMorrow (born 1970), director and writer of the short film Thespian X (2002)
James Vincent McMorrow (born 1983), Irish folk musician
John P. McMorrow (1926–2008), American politician
Judith A. McMorrow (born 1955), American legal scholar
Liam McMorrow (born 1987), Canadian professional basketball player
Mallory McMorrow (born 1986), American politician
Mary Ann McMorrow (1930–2013), former Illinois Supreme Court justice
Melissa McMorrow (born 1981), American boxer
Michael McMorrow (born 1963), American musician, composer, and producer, and founding member of jam band Stolen Ogre
Scott McMorrow, American playwright and actor
Sean McMorrow (born 1982), Canadian ice hockey winger
Virginia G. McMorrow, fantasy/young adult author
William J. McMorrow, American businessman

Surnames
Surnames of British Isles origin
Surnames of Irish origin
English-language surnames